Acterra: Action for a Healthy Planet is a nonprofit environmental education and action organization based in Palo Alto, California. Its main focus is on addressing climate change. Its mission is "Bringing people together to create local solutions for a healthy planet." Program areas include education, clean energy equity, climate adaptation, and corporate sustainability. 

In 2015, Acterra received the Tall Tree Award for Outstanding Nonprofit from the Palo Alto Chamber of Commerce and the Palo Alto Weekly.

References

Environmental organizations based in the San Francisco Bay Area
Environmental organizations based in California